Hamid Azizadeh Toroghi (born June 6, 1981) is an Iranian football defender. He currently plays for Esteghlal in the Iran Pro League.

Club career
He started his club career in Zob Ahan where he moved to Sepahan in 2006 and even played in CWC for Sepahan. He has been mostly the reserve for Mohsen Bengar and Hadi Aghili.

Club career statistics
Last Update  24 May 2010 

 Assist Goals

Honours

Club
Hazfi Cup
Winner: 4
2002/03 with Zob Ahan
2006 Final with Sepahan
2006/07 with Sepahan
2011/12 with Esteghlal

References

External links

1981 births
Living people
Iranian footballers
Esteghlal F.C. players
Zob Ahan Esfahan F.C. players
Sanat Mes Kerman F.C. players
Association football defenders
Sepahan S.C. footballers
Asian Games gold medalists for Iran
Aluminium Hormozgan F.C. players
Asian Games medalists in football
Footballers at the 2002 Asian Games
Medalists at the 2002 Asian Games
21st-century Iranian people